So Long, Bannatyne is the eighth studio album by the Canadian rock band The Guess Who, released in 1971 by RCA Records.

Background
The album's title track includes the words:So long Bannatyne, hello my Chevrier home. The album's packaging and title track illustrate a transition in the life of Guess Who guitarist Kurt Winter moving from the city to the suburbs. The front cover has the words "So Long, Bannatyne" and shows the band dressed casually around a red Chevrolet with a Manitoba license plate in front of The Bannatyne Apartments (located at 545 Bannatyne Avenue in the band's hometown of Winnipeg). The back cover has the words "Hello My Chevrier Home" and shows the band now dressed more formally with the same red Chevy in the back of a home located on Chevrier Boulevard, about 5 miles from downtown Winnipeg.

In 2015 the Bannatyne Apartments building, while vacant, was damaged by fire.

Track listing
All songs written by Burton Cummings and Kurt Winter except where noted.

Side one
"Rain Dance" – 2:45
"She Might Have Been a Nice Girl" (Cummings) – 3:13
"Goin' a Little Crazy" – 6:59
"Fiddlin'" – 1:06
"Pain Train" – 3:45
"One Divided" (Greg Leskiw) – 2:38

Side two
"Grey Day" (Leskiw) – 4:16
"Life in the Bloodstream" (Cummings) – 3:10
"One Man Army" – 3:55
"Sour Suite" (Cummings) – 4:08
"So Long, Bannatyne" – 5:55

Bonus Tracks (2010 Iconoclassic CD Release)
 "Albert Flasher" (Cummings) – 3:06
 "Broken" – 2:44

8-Track
The 8-track release featured a different ordering of tracks:

Track 1: "Life in the Bloodstream", "Fiddlin'", "So Long, Bannatyne"

Track 2: "Rain Dance", "Sour Suite", "Pain Train"

Track 3: "One Divided", "One Man Army", "Grey Day"

Track 4: "She Might Have Been a Nice Girl", "Goin' a Little Crazy"

Personnel
The Guess Who
Burton Cummings – lead vocals, keyboards, saxophone 
Kurt Winter – lead guitar, backing vocals
Greg Leskiw – rhythm guitar, backing vocals, lead vocal and banjo on "One Divided"
Jim Kale – bass, backing vocals
Garry Peterson – drums, backing vocals

Additional personnel
Brian Christian – engineer
Jack Richardson – producer

Charts
Album

Singles

References

1971 albums
The Guess Who albums
Albums produced by Jack Richardson (record producer)
RCA Victor albums